Gurevi (also Romanized as Gūrevī; also known as Gorevī) is a village in Gowharan Rural District, Gowharan District, Bashagard County, Hormozgan Province, Iran. At the 2006 census, its population was 259, in 59 families.

References 

Populated places in Bashagard County